Shao Yijun (born 30 November 1994) is a Chinese bobsledder. He competed in the 2018 Winter Olympics.

References

1994 births
Living people
Bobsledders at the 2018 Winter Olympics
Chinese male bobsledders
Olympic bobsledders of China